Seven Keys can refer to:

 Seven Keys (game show), an American game show hosted by Jack Narz which ran from 1960–65
 Seven Keys (film distributor), a film distributor based in Australia and Great Britain
 Seven Keys (film), a 1962 film
 Seven Keys (Canadian producer)|Seven Keyz owner of Broken Silence Records, Canada.